Rebeka Abramovič (born 6 November 1993) is a Slovenian basketball player for KK Triglav Kranj and the Slovenian national team.

She participated at the EuroBasket Women 2017.

References

1993 births
Living people
Slovenian women's basketball players
Basketball players from Ljubljana
Shooting guards